The 11th African Swimming Championships were held September 10–15, 2012 in Nairobi, Kenya. 

Competition location was the Moi Aquatics Complex in Kasarani.

Participating countries
Countries which sent teams were:

Results

Men

Women

Medal standings
Final medal standings for the 2012 African Swimming Championships are:

External links 
2012 African Swimming Champs Results

African Swimming Championships
Swimming in Kenya
2012 in Kenyan sport
2012 in African sport
International sports competitions hosted by Kenya